Souk El Khemis District is a district of Bouïra Province, Algeria.

Municipalities
The district is further divided into 2 municipalities:
Souk El Khemis
El Mokrani 

Districts of Bouïra Province